São Teotónio is a civil parish in the municipality of Odemira, Portugal. The population in 2011 was 6,439, in an area of 347.25 km2. In 2013 the former parish Zambujeira do Mar merged into the existing parish of São Teotónio.

References

Freguesias of Odemira